The Wonderful Wizard of Oz is a 1910 American silent fantasy film and the earliest surviving film version of L. Frank Baum's 1900 novel The Wonderful Wizard of Oz, made by the Selig Polyscope Company without Baum's direct input. It was created to fulfill a contractual obligation associated with Baum's personal bankruptcy caused by The Fairylogue and Radio-Plays, from which it was once thought to have been derived.  It was partly based on the 1902 stage musical The Wizard of Oz, though much of the film deals with the Wicked Witch of the West, who does not appear in the musical.

Plot
Dorothy Gale (Bebe Daniels) and Imogene the Cow are chased by Hank the Mule. Dorothy runs to the cornfield and discovers that the family Scarecrow (Robert Leonard) is alive. They realize a cyclone is approaching, so they all hide in a haystack. Dorothy and Toto, Hank, Imogene, and the Scarecrow are all swept to the Land of Oz, where soldiers get scared away by the Witch Momba (Winifred Greenwood), who attacks the Wizard of Oz (Hobart Bosworth) due to his threat to her reign. As Dorothy plays with Toto, the good Witch Glinda (Olive Cox) changes Toto into a real protector. Dorothy then encounters the Cowardly Lion, and they encounter the Rusty Woodman and oil his joints. The children meet Eureka the Cat. The Witch kidnaps and imprisons the children. Dorothy throws water on the Witch Momba, killing her and allowing the gang to rescue the animals. Dorothy and her friends arrive at the Emerald City. The citizens dance, and the Scarecrow reads a note that says the Wizard has declared him king, as the Wizard and Dorothy leave in a balloon.

Cast
The credits to the film list Hobart Bosworth, Eugenie Besserer, Robert Leonard, Bebe Daniels, Winifred Greenwood, Lillian Leighton and Olive Cox as the performers, and Otis Turner as director.<ref name=Swartz-174>{{cite book |last1=Swartz |first1=Mark Evan |title=Oz Before the Rainbow: L. Frank Baum's The Wonderful Wizard of Oz on Stage and Screen to 1939 |date=2000 |publisher=Johns Hopkins University Press |location=Baltimore |isbn=0801864771 |page=174 |quote=...the credits for Selig's finished Wizard of Oz film, as published in the standard reference work American Film Index, 1908-1915, list Otis Turner as the director of the film... Assuming the published credits are correct, it is likely that Turner made a trip west to shoot The Wonderful Wizard of Oz.}}</ref>

The cast list does not indicate which characters each credited actor portrayed. In his book Oz Before the Rainbow: L. Frank Baum's The Wonderful Wizard of Oz  Stage and Screen to 1939, Oz scholar Mark Evan Swartz concludes that Daniels, who was eight or nine years old at the time of filming, played Dorothy, and that Bosworth and Leonard likely played the Scarecrow and Tin Woodman, respectively. He takes no position on the rest of the cast assignments.

Michael Patrick Hearn has found ample evidence that both Turner and Daniels were in California at the time. At any rate, that Baum knew of Turner is confirmed by his spoofery of an "Otis Werner" in his Aunt Jane's Nieces Out West, a fictional account inspired by his optimism as an independent filmmaker.

Based on photographs, and assuming the cast list is correct, it appears that Cox is Glinda and Leighton is the servant who pulls out a list of Union rules. Besserer is most likely Momba, and Greenwood likely to be Aunt Em. There is quite a large cast before the camera, and it is unlikely that they will all ever be identified. Hearn emphasizes that this cast list is not contemporary with the film and may have no basis in fact.

Production history

The character Imogene the Cow did not appear in the novel. The cow was used as a replacement for Toto the dog in the stage musical. Many of the costumes and much of the make-up in this film, though notably, not of the Tin Woodman, resemble those used in the 1902 Broadway musical The Wizard of Oz. (None of the songs in the stage show, however, were used in the later MGM film which has become famous.)  As is clear from the plot descriptions below, the presence of Eureka the kitten is drawn from the commingling of material from The Marvelous Land of Oz and Dorothy and the Wizard in Oz; Eureka appears in the latter novel.

Long thought to be culled from footage from The Fairylogue and Radio-Plays (a feature length stage and film show created and presented by Baum in 1908), this was proven not to be the case when the film was recovered.  Although the only known Fairylogue film footage has decomposed (and the interactive nature of the presentation makes the discovery of another print unlikely), the slides, script, and production stills are available (and many have been reprinted in books and magazines) and clearly from another production, which emphasized material from Ozma of Oz that the descriptions of the Selig films imply was ignored.  This film, and its sequels, were created in the wake of Baum's loss of the rights to The Wonderful Wizard of Oz and temporary licensing rights on The Marvelous Land of Oz and John Dough and the Cherub.

Other adaptationsThe Wonderful Wizard of Oz was later followed by the sequels  Dorothy and the Scarecrow in Oz, The Land of Oz, and John Dough and the Cherub. All three were produced in 1910 and are all considered to be lost films.

Sequels

The Selig Polyscope sequels are known only from their catalog descriptions, derived from press releases printed in The Moving Picture World:

Dorothy and the Scarecrow in Oz
Dorothy and the Scarecrow are now in the Emerald City. They have become friends with the Wizard, and together with the woodman, the cowardly lion, and several new creations equally delightful, they journey through Oz -- the earthquake -- and into the glass city. The Scarecrow is elated to think he is going to get his brains at last and be like other men are; the Tin-Woodman is bent upon getting a heart, and the cowardly lion pleads with the great Oz for courage. All these are granted by his Highness. Dorothy picks the princess. -- The Dangerous Mangaboos. -- Into the black pit, and out again. We then see Jim, the cab horse, and myriads of pleasant surprises that hold and fascinate.

The Land of Oz
The Emerald City in all its splendor with all the familiar characters so dear to the hearts of children - Dorothy, the scarecrow, the woodman, the cowardly lion, and the wizard continuing on their triumphal entry to the mystic city, adding new characters, new situations, and scintillating comedy. Dorothy, who has so won her way into the good graces of lovers of fairy folk, finds new encounters in the rebellion army of General Jinger [sic] showing myriads of Leith soldiers in glittering apparel forming one surprise after the other, until the whole resolves itself into a spectacle worthy of the best artists in picturedom. Those who have followed the two preceding pictures of this great subject cannot but appreciate "The Land of Oz," the crowning effort of the Oz series.

John Dough and the Cherub
No description of this film was given, but it does mention the name. It was unlikely to be considered a direct sequel, but is probably based on another L. Frank Baum novel, John Dough and the Cherub.

Home media
One of the films in the 3-disc boxed DVD set called More Treasures from American Film Archives (2004), compiled by the National Film Preservation Foundation from 5 American film archives. This film is preserved by George Eastman House, has a running time of 13 minutes and an added piano score adapted from Paul Tietjens's music from the 1902 stage play and performed by Martin Marks.  It is also included in the 3-disc edition of the 1939 film version. On this edition, John Thomas performs a compilation of Oz-related music by Louis F. Gottschalk.

See also
The Wizard of Oz adaptations — other adaptations of The Wonderful Wizard of Oz''
Treasures from American Film Archives

References

External links

 
 

1910 films
Silent American fantasy films
American silent short films
American black-and-white films
Films directed by Otis Turner
Films based on American novels
Films based on fantasy novels
Films based on The Wizard of Oz
Selig Polyscope Company films
Articles containing video clips
Surviving American silent films
Films about witchcraft
Films set in Kansas
1910s fantasy films
1910s American films
Silent horror films
1910s English-language films